The 1989 Grand Prix de Tennis de Toulouse was a men's tennis tournament played on indoor carpet courts in Toulouse, France that was part of the Regular Series of the 1989 Grand Prix tennis circuit. It was the eighth edition of the tournament and was held from 9 October until 15 October 1989. Second-seeded Jimmy Connors won the singles title.

Finals

Singles

 Jimmy Connors defeated  John McEnroe, 6–3, 6–3
 It was Connors' 1st singles title of the year and the 108th of his career.

Doubles

 Mansour Bahrami /  Éric Winogradsky defeated  Todd Nelson /  Roger Smith, 6–2, 7–6.

See also
 Connors–McEnroe rivalry

References

External links
 ITF tournament edition details

Grand Prix de Tennis de Toulouse
Grand Prix de Tennis de Toulouse
Grand Prix de Tennis de Toulouse
Grand Prix de Tennis de Toulouse